Olivia Magno (born 4 November 1972 in Darlinghurst, New South Wales) is an Australian former cricket player. She played in the Women's National Cricket League for the New South Wales women's cricket team in the 1996/1997 season and for the South Australia Women's cricket team in the 1997/1998 to 2003/2004 seasons. Magno played five tests and 44 One Day Internationals for the Australia national women's cricket team.

References

Further reading

External links
 Olivia Magno at southernstars.org.au
 Olivia Magno  at CricketArchive

Living people
1972 births
Australia women Test cricketers
Australia women One Day International cricketers